The Fate of Lee Khan (Chinese: 迎春閣之風波) is a 1973 Hong Kong wuxia film, directed by King Hu.

Plot
During the waning years of the Yuan Dynasty, Mongol general Lee Khan and his sister Wan’er travel to the desolate Spring Inn in Shaanxi province to obtain a map of the tactical plans of the rebel forces. Aided by Wan Jen-Mi, innkeeper of the Spring Inn, a group of undercover resistance fighters seek to recover the map to save the rebellion.

Cast
Cast adapted from the 2019 Masters of Cinema blu-ray.

Analysis
The film is one of the Chinese action films that helped encourage that there be more female action roles.

The director King Hu used methods of framing to show action scenes in detail. Close to the end of the film, the director used cutting patterns and edge framing to show how similar all of the fighters' moves are. Hu also filmed The Fate of Lee Khan back to back with The Valiant Ones.

Release
The Fate of Lee Khan was distributed in Hong Kong on December 6, 1973.

Reception
From contemporary reviews, Tony Rayns reviewed The Fate of Lee Khan in Sight & Sound finding the film "always strikingly beautiful" and that its "bald narrative outline risks suggesting that Lee Khan would sit more comfortably within the Chinese martial arts genre than in fact it does. Its vividly stylised clashes" were "far from being the film's raison d'etre as they are from being mere set-pieces.". Rayns concluded that the film was a "remarkable , and not just by the standards of Hong Kong cinema. One can only hope that its appearance here (mercifully subtitled, not dubbed) may herald more of King Hu's work." Verina Glessner of the Monthly Film Bulletin stated that director King Hu "comes closest of all currently active Chinese directors to fitting our notion of an art film director" noting that he "isn't averse to check-mating audience expectations as much as his characters' moves." Glessner also noted the script by King Hu and Wang Chung that "like the direction and the gallery of  performances, shows a rare sharpness and sophistication."

From retrospective reviews, Michael Brooke wrote in Sight & Sound once the film is set up it was as "taut as any Hitchcock or Clouzot suspense. Violent  erupts out of nowhere and ends almost as quickly as it began- at least, until the final pitched battle which is also the film's only really prolonged exterior scene." Glenn Kenny of the New York Times made the film his "New York Times Critic's Pic" and stated that the film " falls into a sweet lather, rinse, repeat mode of scenes, alternating character intrigue and fighting."

References

External links
 The Fate of Lee Khan at the Internet Movie Database

Kung fu films
Mandarin-language films
1973 films
Hong Kong martial arts films
Films directed by King Hu
Golden Harvest films
1970s Hong Kong films